Acacia hemignosta commonly known as the clubleaf wattle, is a tree or shrub of the genus Acacia and the subgenus Plurinerves that is endemic to northern parts of Australia.

Description
It has rough, corky and fissured bark with pendulous brittle branchlets. The green to yellowish green to grey green phyllodes have an oblanceolate to narrowly oblanceolate shape and are straight to shallowly recurved. It blooms from June to October and produces yellow flowers.

Taxonomy
The species was first formally described by the botanist Ferdinand von Mueller in 1859 as part of the work Contributiones ad Acaciarum Australiae Cognitionem as published in Journal of the Proceedings of the Linnean Society, Botany. It was reclassified as Racosperma hemignostum in 1987 by Leslie Pedley but transferred back into the genus Acacia in 2001. The only other synonym is Acacia cloncurrensis.

Distribution
It is native across the Northern Territory and the Kimberley region of Western Australia as well as northern Queensland. The plant is found in flat or undulating country growing in sandy and lateritic soils in and heavier soils around watercourses and is usually a part of open woodland communities.

See also
 List of Acacia species

References

hemignosta
Acacias of Western Australia
Flora of the Northern Territory
Taxa named by Ferdinand von Mueller
Plants described in 1859